Flint Rasmussen (born January 25, 1968) is an American professional rodeo barrelman. He is perhaps the most famous "rodeo clown" or "rodeo barrelman" in the sport of bull riding. He currently resides in Billings, Montana, United States.

A former high school math and history teacher, Rasmussen signed a contract with the Professional Bull Riders and currently provides entertainment at their Premier Series events. Long associated with the Professional Rodeo Cowboys Association, Rasmussen earned the title of PRCA Clown of the Year for eight consecutive years and won the Coors Man in the Can honor seven times.

Early life 

On January 25, 1968, Stan and Tootsie Rasmussen had their youngest child, Flint, in Havre, Montana. Flint Rasmussen grew up in Choteau, Montana, where he started his career in sports.   Rasmussen was an All-State football player and track star for Choteau High School. After high school, Rasmussen attended college at the University of Montana Western where he completed a double major in history and math as an honor student. As the public radio sports announcer for the UMW Bulldogs, Rasmussen had his voice heard for the first time by an audience. To help with the expenses of college, Rasmussen worked as a barrel clown in western Montana. Rasmussen made his first appearance as a rodeo clown in Superior, Montana, at the age of 19. Flint had his first thoughts about being a rodeo clown when he told his father and brother that he could do better than the rodeo clowns at the time. "I just thought it needed a new energy, a young guy who could relate and get young people to get back to rodeo," Rasmussen said. After he completed college, Flint Rasmussen returned to the town he was born in, Havre, and taught at Havre High School in addition to coaching football and track. While teaching at Havre High School, Flint was also the public address announcer at Northern Montana College (now MSU - Northern) home Lights and Skylights Basketball games. After two years of teaching and coaching, Rasmussen grew restless and started his career as a barrelman.

Family 
Flint Rasmussen comes from a rodeo family with three other siblings.  He has two brothers, Will and Pete, and a sister, Linda White. Flint's parents are Stan and Tootsie Rasmussen. Stan Rasmussen, Flint's father, was a rodeo announcer and his brother, Will, followed in his father's footsteps as a rodeo announcer. Will still is a top PRCA rodeo announcer. Flint met ex-wife, Katie Grasky, who was a barrel racer, while he was touring. Flint has two daughters, Shelby and Paige, who also barrel race.

Achievements 
"I think it's hard to come into this sport cold at 25 and try to learn it,"  Rasmussen said.  But that did not stop him. Flint Rasmussen did his first Wrangler National Finals Rodeo (NFR) in 1998.   That same year, he was a barrel clown at the Pendleton Round Up, and thirteen years later, in 2011, Rasmussen was inducted into the Pendleton Hall of Fame.   When Flint signed with the Professional Bull Riders (PBR) in 2005, the contract was exclusive and Rasmussen now only works for the PBR.   Before signing with the PBR, Rasmussen was the Professional Rodeo Cowboys Association (PRCA) Clown of the Year for eight consecutive years.   Along with those honors, he was the Coors Man in the Can seven times.  In 2010, Rasmussen made a special appearance as the Pendleton High School graduation speaker. In 2011, Rasmussen was inducted into the Pendleton Round-Up and Happy Canyon Hall of Fame. In 2014, he was inducted into the St. Paul Rodeo Hall of Fame. In 2019, he was inducted into the Ellensburg Rodeo Hall of Fame.

Health episode 
On March 11, 2009, Flint Rasmussen, at the age of 41, suffered a heart attack at his house in Choteau, Montana.   After a couple of procedures, he was back in the arena in a short time.  "The No. 1 thing that surprised me was the crowd reaction... and I've missed these people,"   Rasmussen said on returning to the arena after his heart attack.  He got back to the arena with only a few differences: he had to wear a heart rate monitor and had to take a few breaks when his heart rate exceeded 140 bpm.

2020s 
During the 2022 PBR Team Series, Rasmussen served as a second sideline reporter, joining Allen Bestwick in the role at some events. However, at other Team Series events, he returned to his role as arena entertainer.

In February 2023, Rasmussen announced that he was retiring as PBR arena entertainer at the end of the 2023 PBR World Finals in Fort Worth, Texas in May. He would join the commentator booth for the PBR Team Series during the second half of the calendar year.

References

1968 births
Living people
Rodeo clowns
People from Choteau, Montana
People from Havre, Montana
University of Montana alumni
Schoolteachers from Montana